Harriot Sumner Curtis (June 30, 1881 – October 25, 1974) was an American amateur golfer and an early participant in the sport of skiing. From the Manchester, Massachusetts area, she was one of ten children. Her father was a colonel in the Union Army cavalry during the American Civil War. Her brother, James Freeman Curtis became a lawyer in New York City and was the Assistant United States Secretary of the Treasury under President William Howard Taft.

Her cousin, Laurence Curtis, who served as the second President of the United States Golf Association in 1897-98, encouraged the family to take up the game of golf. As a result, Harriot and her sister younger Margaret began playing golf at an early age. As young ladies they played out of the Essex County Club in Manchester and were members of the Women's Golf Association of Massachusetts. Founded in 1900, it the first state women's golf association in the United States.

In 1904, Harriot Curtis was a co-winner of the Medal given to the golfer who shoots the lowest score in qualifying rounds at the United States Women's Amateur Golf Championship. At the 1906 U.S. Championship, held at the Brae Burn Country Club near Boston, she defeated Mary B. Adams in the finals to win the title. In 1907 she met her sister Margaret in the final at the Midlothian Country Club, near Chicago. Her sister won the title and went on to win the Championship two more times. In 1908, Harriot Curtis set a record with the lowest score at the U.S. Championship but lost in the second round.

In 1905 the Curtis sisters and a number of other American women golfers made a visit to Britain to compete in the British Ladies Amateur Championship. They also played in an informal match between Britain and America a few days before the Championship. This visit led to four British women coming to the United States to compete in the U.S. Championship a few years later in 1909. One of the British women was that year's British Amateur champion Dorothy Campbell who won the U.S. title, becoming the first woman to hold both golf titles.

In 1932, Margaret Curtis and her sister donated the Curtis Cup for the biennial golfing competition between the United States and Great Britain. Active in golfing matters for most of her life, in December 1955 the Women's Golf Association of Massachusetts established a tournament in her and her sister's honor. The trophy, known as "The Curtis Bowl," is a replica of the Curtis Cup.

She died in Manchester, Massachusetts, aged 93.

History of Charity and Philanthropy and Other Activities 
Harriot and Margaret Curtis were heavily involved in charity and philanthropy throughout the entirety of their lives. They did a lot of work to improve people's lives in the areas of health and medicine. In the early 20th century, the pair founded a health clinic called Maverick Dispensary that gradually grew in patients each year. The sisters paid for the expenses for the clinic out of pocket. Their work was extremely important considering that many people were impoverished, especially the Italian American population they served, and didn't have access to healthcare. The sisters have also been associated with other organizations in the Boston area.

In addition to golf and providing medical access, Harriot was also interested in education. She served as the dean of women in Hampton Institute in Virginia from 1927-1931.

References

External links
Papers, 1797-1991. Schlesinger Library, Radcliffe Institute, Harvard University.

American female golfers
Amateur golfers
Winners of ladies' major amateur golf championships
Golfers from Massachusetts
Sportspeople from Essex County, Massachusetts
People from Manchester-by-the-Sea, Massachusetts
1881 births
1974 deaths